Caught in the Act is a live double album by Styx, released in 1984. It contains one new song, "Music Time", which was released as a single, reaching #40 on the Billboard Hot 100 charts.

Caught in the Act is also the name of a VHS video recording that featured the band acting out the concept established in their Kilroy Was Here album. A DVD version was released on December 11, 2007.

Shortly after this album's release, Tommy Shaw officially announced his departure from the band to pursue a solo career (although he quit midway through the Kilroy tour on stage angering James Young, Chuck Panozzo, and John Panozzo). As a result, the band then went into hiatus for the rest of the 1980s because Dennis DeYoung refused to replace Shaw and hoped he'd return after the solo albums. Caught In The Act would ultimately prove to be the final album by the massively successful 1975-84 Styx lineup of DeYoung, Shaw, JY and the Panozzo brothers; by the time Shaw returned to the band in 1995, John Panozzo's declining health prevented his participation, and he died in 1996.

Track listing

Side 1
"Music Time" [*] (DeYoung) – 4:45
Lead vocals: Dennis DeYoung
Lead guitar: Tommy Shaw
"Mr. Roboto" (DeYoung) – 4:59
Lead vocals: Dennis DeYoung
"Too Much Time on My Hands" (Shaw) – 5:01
Lead vocals and lead guitar: Tommy Shaw
"Babe" (DeYoung) – 4:52
Lead vocals: Dennis DeYoung
Lead guitar: Tommy Shaw

Side 2
"Snowblind" (Young, DeYoung) – 6:00
Co-lead vocals and lead guitar: James "JY" Young, 
Co-lead vocals: Tommy Shaw
"State Street Sadie" (uncredited) / "The Best of Times" (DeYoung) – 6:30
Lead vocals: Dennis DeYoung
Lead guitar: Tommy Shaw
"Suite Madame Blue" (DeYoung) – 8:51
Lead vocals and synthesizer solo: Dennis DeYoung
Lead guitar: James "JY" Young

Side 3
"Rockin' the Paradise" (DeYoung, Young, Shaw) – 4:40
Lead vocals: Dennis DeYoung
First guitar solo: Tommy Shaw
Second guitar solo: James "JY" Young
"Blue Collar Man (Long Nights)" (Shaw) – 4:47
Lead vocals and lead guitar: Tommy Shaw
Guitar fills and end solo: James "JY" Young
"Miss America" (Young) – 6:15
Lead vocals and lead guitar: James Young
"Don't Let It End" (DeYoung) – 5:25 (on US LP, cassette and CD)
Lead vocals: Dennis DeYoung
Lead guitar: Tommy Shaw

"Boat on the River" (Shaw) – 3:10 (on LP AMLM 66704, A&M Records 1984)
Accordion: Dennis DeYoung
Lead vocals, lead guitar, mandolin: Tommy Shaw

Side 4
"Fooling Yourself (The Angry Young Man)" (Shaw) – 6:05
Lead vocals: Tommy Shaw
Synthesizer solos: Dennis DeYoung
"Crystal Ball" (Shaw) – 6:24
Lead vocals and lead guitar: Tommy Shaw
Synthesizer solo: Dennis DeYoung
"Come Sail Away" (DeYoung) – 8:56
Lead vocals, synthesizer solo: Dennis DeYoung
Lead guitar: Tommy Shaw

* New studio recording

Video track listing
Kilroy Was Here mini-movie
"Mr. Roboto" (DeYoung)
"Rockin' the Paradise (with J.Y. guitar solo)" (DeYoung, Shaw, Young)
"Blue Collar Man" (Shaw)
"Snowblind" (DeYoung, Young)
"Too Much Time on My Hands" (Shaw)
"Don't Let It End" (DeYoung)
"Heavy Metal Poisoning" (Young)
"Cold War (with extended Tommy Shaw guitar solo and extra verses)" (Shaw)
"State Street Sadie" (uncredited) / "The Best of Times" (DeYoung)
"Come Sail Away" (DeYoung)
"Renegade (with John Panozzo drum solo and band getting arrested)" (Shaw)
"Haven't We Been Here Before" (Shaw)
"Don't Let It End (Reprise)" (DeYoung)

DVD bonus tracks
"Come Sail Away" (1977 video)
"Borrowed Time" (1979 video)
"Babe" (1979 video)
"Boat On the River" (1979 video)
"A.D. 1928"/"Rockin' the Paradise" (1981 video)
"The Best of Times" (1981 video)
"Too Much Time on My Hands" (1981 video)
"Mr. Roboto" (1983 video)
"Don't Let It End" (1983 video)
"Heavy Metal Poisoning" (1983 video)
"Haven't We Been Here Before" (video)
"Music Time" (1984 video)

Personnel
 Dennis DeYoung – vocals, keyboards, accordion
 Tommy Shaw – vocals, guitars, mandolin
 James "JY" Young – vocals, guitars, keyboards
 Chuck Panozzo – bass
 John Panozzo – drums

Production (album)
 Producer: Styx
 Engineers: Gary Loizzo, Will Rascati, Rob Kingsland, Biff Dawes
 Recorded with Westwood One Mobile at Saenger Theater, New Orleans in April, 1983 except "Music Time" which was recorded at Pumpkin Studios in January, 1984
 Overdubs and mixing at Pumpkin Studios, Oak Lawn, Illinois
 Assistant engineer: Jim Popko
 Mastering engineer: Ted Jensen at Sterling Sound, NYC

Production (video)
 Concert producer and director: Jerry Kramer
 Kilroy Was Here mini-movie director: Brian Gibson
 Cameramen: Wayne Isham

Charts
Album - Billboard (United States)

Singles - Billboard (United States)

References

External links 
 Styx - Caught in the Act (1984) album review by Bret Adams, credits & releases at AllMusic.com
 Styx - Caught in the Act (1984) album releases & credits at Discogs.com
 Styx - Caught in the Act (1984) album credits & user reviews at ProgArchives.com
 Styx - Caught in the Act (1984) album to be listened as stream at Spotify.com

1984 live albums
2007 live albums
2007 video albums
Live video albums
Styx (band) live albums
Styx (band) video albums
A&M Records live albums
A&M Records video albums